, was the second head of the Kaya-no-miya collateral branch of the Japanese imperial family. A general in the Imperial Japanese Army, he was first cousin to Empress Kōjun (Nagako), the wife of Emperor Shōwa (Hirohito).

Early life
Prince Kaya Tsunenori was born in Tokyo, the first son of Prince Kaya Kuninori and his wife, the former Daigō Yoshiko. He received his primary and secondary education at the boys' department of the Gakushuin Peers’ School. On December 8, 1909, he became the second head of the Kaya-no-miya house upon his father's death.

Military career
Like the other imperial princes of his generation, Prince Kaya was a career military officer. In 1920, after serving a term in the House of Peers, he graduated from the 32nd class of the Imperial Japanese Army Academy and received a commission as a lieutenant (2nd class) in the cavalry. In August 1925, he became commander of the Tenth Cavalry Regiment (at the rank of captain) and graduated from the 38th class of Army Staff College. The following year, he rose to the rank of major in the cavalry, and was appointed an instructor at the Army Staff College the following year. He joined the Imperial Japanese Army General Staff in 1933 and was promoted to colonel two years later.

Prince and Princess Kaya undertook a seven-month world tour in 1934, visiting the United States, Great Britain, France, and Germany. The tour received extensive press coverage at the time.

After his return to Japan, he replaced his uncle, Prince Asaka Yasuhiko, as the emperor's personal envoy to Nanking, the occupied capital of Nationalist China, following the Nanjing Massacre in January 1938. He was promoted to major general in 1940 and lieutenant general in 1943 in command of the IJA 43rd Division. Prince Kaya became commander of the Third Imperial Guard Division in 1944 and briefly served as president of the Army Staff College during the closing stages of World War II.

Commoner life
After October 14, 1947, Prince Kaya Tsunenori and his family were divested of their imperial status and become commoners due to the American occupation authorities' reform of the Japanese imperial household. Barred from holding public office because of his military career, the former prince received a lump payment from the reconstituted Imperial Household Council in order to "maintain his dignity." The former prince later served on the boards of directors of the Taishō Life Insurance Company and Nissan Mutual Life Insurance Company. He served as the honorary president of the International Martial Arts Federation from its founding in 1953 until 1965. The former prince was a noted fan and supporter of Japanese baseball. In 1970, he founded a retirement home in Nagano Prefecture.

The former prince died of a heart ailment on January 2, 1978, at his home in Chiba Prefecture.

The former Kaya-no-miya palace is now the site of the Chidorigafuchi National Cemetery in downtown Tokyo.

Marriage and family
On May 3, 1921, Prince Kaya married Kujō Toshiko (May 16, 1903 – March 23, 1993), the third daughter of Prince Kujō Michizane, head of one of the Five regent houses of the Fujiwara clan. His wife was also a niece of Empress Teimei, the consort of the Emperor Taishō. The couple had seven children:

 , (April 21, 1922 – April 19, 1986)
  (July 29, 1923 – April 21, 2009)
 , (July 3, 1926 – June 5, 2011)
 , (August 17, 1929 – November 4, 1994)
 , (July 12, 1931 – February 16, 2021)
 , (November 24, 1935 – December 23, 2017)
 , (August 5, 1942 – July 20, 2017)

Gallery

Sources
 Foreign Affairs Association of Japan, The Japan Year Book, 1939-40 (Tokyo: Kenkyusha Press, 1939).
 Foreign Affairs Association of Japan, The Japan Year Book, 1945 (Tokyo: Kenkyusha Press, 1946).
 "Royal Japanese Greeted Here; Spend Afternoon Seeing Sights; Prince and Princess Kaya Saluted in Harbor and Received by Notables," New York Times, 15 August 1934, p. 19.
 "Britain And Japan: Prince Kaya's Visit," The Times, 3 May 1934, p. 16.
 Japan Biographical Encyclopedia and Who's Who. Tokyo, Rengo-Press: 1965.
 "Obituary 1--No Title," New York Times, 4 January 1978, p. D19.

1900 births
1978 deaths
Japanese generals
Japanese princes
Members of the House of Peers (Japan)
Kaya-no-miya
People from Tokyo
Japanese military personnel of World War II